The Deadly Hunter by Jude Watson is the eleventh in a series of young reader novels called Jedi Apprentice. The series explores the adventures of Qui-Gon Jinn and Obi-Wan Kenobi prior to Star Wars: Episode I – The Phantom Menace.

Plot
When a murderer tries to kill Didi, a friend of Qui-Gon Jinn, he and his fourteen-year-old apprentice Obi-Wan Kenobi must stop the murderer. But they fail and the murderer, a bounty hunter by the name of Ona Nobis, starts going after them.

After several days of investigations, Obi-Wan and Qui-Gon learn that Ona Nobis will stop at nothing, and Didi must be sent away from Coruscant. Unfortunately, Didi is attacked at his sanctuary, and Obi-Wan and Qui-Gon are forced to fight Ona Nobis. Qui-Gon is captured by the bounty hunter, and it quickly becomes clear that it was all a plot to capture him, not Didi.

External links

Amazon.com Listing
Official CargoBay Listing
TheForce.net review

2000 British novels
2000 science fiction novels
Star Wars: Jedi Apprentice
Star Wars Legends novels
English novels